Minuscule 666 (in the Gregory-Aland numbering), ε 1293 (von Soden), is a Greek minuscule manuscript of the New Testament, on parchment. Palaeographically it has been assigned to the 13th century. The manuscript is lacunose. Scrivener labelled it by 899e.

Description 

The codex contains the entire of the four Gospels, on 298 parchment leaves (size ) with some lacunae. The text of John 3:4-18; 5:12-6:7; 7:2-21:25.

The text is written in one column per page, 23-24 lines per page.

There are the Ammonian Sections are given at the margin to the Gospel of Matthew, but only from number α' to number κβ'.

Lectionary markings and subscriptions to the Gospel of John were added by a later hand.

Text 

The Greek text of the codex is a representative of the Byzantine text-type. Kurt Aland placed it in Category V.

According to the Claremont Profile Method it belongs to the textual family Kx in Luke 1; 10; 20.

History 

Gregory dated the manuscript to the 12th or 13th century. Currently the manuscript is dated by the INTF to the 13th century.

The manuscript came to USA from Albania.

Gregory saw the manuscript in 1889.

Currently the manuscript is housed at the Harvard University Library (Ms. Gr. 1), in Cambridge, Massachusetts.

See also 

 List of New Testament minuscules
 Biblical manuscript
 Textual criticism

References

Further reading 
 E. J. Goodspied, The Harvard Gospels, AJT X (1906), 687-700
 E. J. Goodspied, The Harvard Gospels, HLS 6 (1919), 171-86 and plate 1
 K. W. Clark, A Descriptive Catalogue of Greek New Testament Manuscripts in America (Chicago, 1937), pp. 107–109

Greek New Testament minuscules
13th-century biblical manuscripts